B4 the Storm is the first album by American hip-hop collective and record label Internet Money. It was released on August 28, 2020 via Internet Money Records and TenThousand Projects. The album was completed in one month and contains many throwaway songs that were reworked. The album features guest appearances from TyFontaine, Trippie Redd, Lil Keed, Young Nudy, Iann Dior, Lil Skies, Lil Mosey, Cochise, TheHxliday, Lil Tecca, Swae Lee, Future, the Kid Laroi, late rapper and singer Juice Wrld, 24kGoldn, A Boogie wit da Hoodie, Wiz Khalifa, StaySolidRocky, LilSpirit, Kevin Gates, Gunna, Don Toliver, and Nav.

Background
The album was first announced by Nick Mira and Taz Taylor in July 2020 during an interview with Lyrical Lemonade. Taylor stated: "We finalized our deal with 10K Projects in like August or September of last year [2019], but we had already been talking about an album for a minute. I brought it up to Elliot [Grainge] that I wanted to drop songs as an artist under Internet Money—just my favorite artists working together and putting songs together, like some DJ Khaled type." Taylor said he gave himself a deadline of June 1, 2020 to turn the album in: "So we did the whole album in a month, top to bottom: features, big artists, beats, everything. We mixed and mastered the whole album at least 50 different times". The tracklist was revealed on August 14, 2020, along with the release of the single "Lemonade". According to Taylor, B4 the Storm contains many "throwaway" songs that artists did not want. With the blessing of the artists, many of the songs were changed into completely new records.

Cover art
Alex Zidel of HotNewHipHop described the original album artwork, which "show[ed] an amusement park with American rapper and singer Trippie Redd's face opening up to allow people entry to the rides, much like American rapper and singer Travis Scott did for the cover of his third studio album, Astroworld. There [was] a special section for American rapper Lil Tecca and a blimp flying above for the late American rapper and singer Juice Wrld as each member of the Internet Money collective goes on a thrill-seeking rollercoaster ride". The artwork was designed by Moodzanzan.

Commercial performance
The album debuted and peaked at number 10 on the Billboard 200 during the chart week of September 12, 2020.

Track listing

Charts

Weekly charts

Year-end charts

Certifications

References

2020 albums
Hip hop albums by American artists